Butoku Dam  is an earthfill dam located in Hokkaido Prefecture in Japan. The dam is used for irrigation. The catchment area of the dam is 11.3 km2. The dam impounds about 34  ha of land when full and can store 2752 thousand cubic meters of water. The construction of the dam was completed in 1929.

References

Dams in Hokkaido